Rolando Ceferino Figueroa (born 14 April 1969) is an Argentine politician, currently serving as a National Deputy elected in Neuquén Province. A member of the regionalist Neuquén People's Movement party, Figueroa was elected in 2021 and currently sits in the Provincias Unidas inter-bloc.

Figueroa previously served as Vice Governor of Neuquén from 2015 to 2019, under Governor Omar Gutiérrez. Prior to that, he was mayor of Chos Malal from 2011 to 2015, and a member of the Legislature of Neuquén from 2007 to 2011.

Early life and career
Figueroa was born on 14 April 1969 in Andacollo, Neuquén Province, into an important family in the province. His grandfather, Temístocles Figueroa, was the first native-born Argentine citizen in Neuquén, while his uncle, Rogelio Figueroa, was active in local politics in Huinganco and is widely known for promoting afforestation efforts in the region.

He studied public accounting at the National University of Comahue.

Political career
From 2007 to 2011, Figueroa was a member of the Legislature of Neuquén elected in the Neuquén People's Movement list. In 2011, he was elected as intendente (mayor) of Chos Malal. In the 2015 provincial elections, Figueroa was the running mate of Omar Gutiérrez in the MPN ticket to the governorship of Neuquén: with 40.57% of the vote, the MPN maintained its unbroken streak as the province's governing party since the return of democracy in 1983.

National Deputy
In the 2021 legislative election, Figueroa ran for one of Neuquén's seats in the National Chamber of Deputies as part of the MPN list; he won in the PASO primaries against the list supported by Governor Gutiérrez in September 2021, and became the party's candidate ahead of the general election. In the general election, the MPN list was the most voted in the province, with 29.44% of the vote, and Figueroa was elected. He was the sole MPN deputy in the 2021–2023 term, and formed part of the "Provincias Unidas" parliamentary inter-bloc alongside other provincial parties such as Misiones' FRC and Río Negro's JSRN.

References

External links
Profile on the official website of the Chamber of Deputies (in Spanish)

Living people
1969 births
People from Neuquén Province
Members of the Argentine Chamber of Deputies elected in Neuquén
Mayors of places in Argentina
Neuquén People's Movement politicians
National University of Comahue alumni
20th-century Argentine politicians
21st-century Argentine politicians